The Hattian Bala District is one of the ten districts of Azad Kashmir, Pakistan. The district's headquarters is the town of Hattian Bala. Prior to 2009, the Hattian Bala District was a tehsil within Muzaffarabad District.

History
Before the establishment of Azad Kashmir in 1947, what is now the Hattian Bala District was the part of the Uri Tehsil of the Baramulla District in  Jammu and Kashmir.  Following the ceasefire of the first war between India and Pakistan, Hattian Bala became part of the Muzaffarabad District and remained so until 2009. During Pakistan's coalition government of Sardar Muhammad Yaqoob Khan, Hattian Bala was made a district in July 2009.

Geography

The Hattian Bala District is bounded on the north and east by the Kupwara District and the Baramulla District of Indian-administered Jammu and Kashmir, on the south by the Bagh District, and on the west by the Muzaffarabad District.  The Hattian Bala District has a population of 230,529.

Economy
The rural urban ratio is 90:10. The majority of the rural population depend on agriculture, livestock, and forestry for subsistence. Many people work or are settled abroad in the Middle East, the United Kingdom, and the United States, and they support their families who they have left behind.  The Hattian Bala District is primarily a hilly and mountainous region with stretches of plains along the Jehlum River, which enters the district at the LOC point at Chakothi and continues northwest through the Jehlum Valley. Due to its fast-flowing rivers, the Hattian Bala District has great hydroelectric potential.  Hydroelectric power stations are located at Kathai, Leepa, and Sharian.  The district's natural environment includes the valleys of Leepa, Khalana Chham, Ghail, Saina Daman Chamm, Dhani Shahdarrah, Charoi, Chinari, Jaskool, Chonoian, Bharyan (Lower Chonoian), and Chakar Salmia.

Languages
The main languages of the district are Pahari (native to about half of the population), Gujari (spoken by about a third), and Kashmiri (native to one out of six inhabitants).

Administrative divisions
The Hattian Bala District consists of three tehsils:

 Chikkar Tehsil 
 Hattian Bala Tehsil
 Leepa Tehsil

The district council of Hattian Bala has 12 union councils (consisting of eight UCs from Constituency No. 5 and four UCs from Constituency No. 6), one municipal committee at Hattian, and one town committee at Chikar.  The rural development department has three centers: Hattian, Leepa, and Chikar.  The Assistant Director of LG&RDD Hattian is the administrative officer for rural development, with two project managers at each center.

Education
According to the Alif Ailaan Pakistan District Education Rankings 2015, the Hattian Bala District is ranked 28 out of 148 districts in terms of education. For facilities and infrastructure, the district is ranked 112 out of 148.
The district has few colleges, so many people in the district attend the Allama Iqbal Open University or the AJK University at its main Muzaffarabad campus, at its Neelum campus, or at the recently inaugurated Hattian Bala campus, which has faculties for the teaching of the English Language, computer science, and business administration. Two areas in the district are renowned for education, having high literacy rates: Leepa Valley and the village of Pahal, located near the LOC. The district also has some private institutions, such as the READ Foundation Science College Hattian Bala, the READ Foundation Science College Chenari, and the Smart School Hattian Bala.

Notable people
Raja Farooq Haider Khan belongs from Salmia Hattian bala. He remained PM of AJK from 2016 to 2021.  His father Raja Haider khan was also a Nobel man of Chikar Hattian bala.Sahibzada Muhammad Ishaq Zaffar former PPP president AJK also belonged from Bani Hafiz a village of Hattian Bala.The mausoleum of Sikandar Shah kazmi is located in Hattian bala who was a spiritual person his urs is held every year in Hattian Bala.Diwan Ali Khan chughtai is minister of education Schools AJK , he belongs from Hattian Bala..His father Ali Khan Chughtai was also politician and remained minister.

References 

Districts of Azad Kashmir